Alia Syed (born 1964) is an experimental filmmaker and artist of Welsh-Indian descent.

Biography
Born in Swansea, Wales, Syed earned her Bachelors in Fine Arts from the University of East London in 1987 and a Postgraduate degree in Mixed Media from the Slade School of Fine Art in 1992. She has taught and lectured at Central St. Martins and the Chelsea College of Art and Design, and she is now an associate lecturer at Southampton Solent University. Syed’s work has been screened and exhibited in museums, galleries, and festivals worldwide, including at the Los Angeles County Museum of Art (LACMA),  Museum of Modern Art (MoMA) in New York City, Museo Nacional Centro de Arte Reina Sofia in Madrid, Institute of International Visual Arts (inIVA) in London, and the Talwar Gallery, which has represented her for over a decade, in New York City and in New Delhi.  Syed lives and works in London, UK.

Syed’s work focuses on issues of identity, representation, and language, often incorporating sound and text, in addition to images and characters, to explore and question structures of personal and collective narrative. Syed has said, “I am interested in language; we construct ourselves through language; it creates the space where we define ourselves. Film can be a mirror—it can throw things back at us in a way that makes us question the ideas we have about ourselves and through this each other…I [am] interested in what happens when you hold more than one ‘culture’ within you at any given time.”

Selected exhibitions

Solo exhibitions 
 2019  Talwar Gallery, Meta Incognita: Missive II, New York, NY, US
 2018  LUX, Wallpaper, London, UK
 2017  Talwar Gallery, On a wing and a prayer, New York, NY, US
 2013  Talwar Gallery, Panopticon Letters: Missive I, New York, NY, US
 2012  Los Angeles County Museum of Art (LACMA), Eating Grass, Los Angeles, CA, US
 2010  Talwar Gallery, Wallpaper, New York, NY, US
 2009  Museo Nacional Centro de Arte Reina Sofia, Imagine your own history, Madrid, Spain
 Talwar Gallery, Elision, New Delhi, India
 2008  Talwar Gallery, New York, NY, US
 2006  Millais Gallery, Southampton, UK
 2005  Arts Depot, 1001100111001, London, UK, Eating Grass
 2004  Talwar Gallery, Eating Grass, New York, NY, US
 2003  Institute of International Visual Arts (InIVA), London, UK
 Talwar Gallery, New York, NY, US
 2002  Jigar, a retrospective of Alia Syed's film works
 (February --March) The New Art Gallery Walsall, UK
 (February --March) The Space Gallery at InIVA, London, UK
 (June --August) Turnpike Gallery, Manchester, UK
 (June --September) Gallery of Modern Art, Glasgow, Scotland

Selected other exhibitions 
 2018  Kiran Nadar Museum of Art, Delirium Equilibrium, New Delhi, India
 Lahore Biennale 01, Lahore, Pakistan
 2016  Van Every/Smith Museum Galleries, Contents Under Pressure, Davidson, North Carolina, US
 2015  Hangar, GHOSTS, Lisbon, Portugal
 2014  Pumphouse Gallery, You cannot step twice into the same river, London, UK
 Solyanka State Gallery, PARAJANOV, Moscow, Russia
 2013  5th Moscow Biennale of Contemporary Art, Moscow, Russia
 2011  Glynn Vivian Art Gallery, Ffilm 3, Swansea, UK
 2010  Museum of Modern Art (MoMA), On Line, curated by Connie Butler and Catherine de Zegher, New York, NY, US
 2009  Talwar Gallery, Excerpts from Diary Pages, New York, NY, US
 2006  XV Sydney Biennale, Zones of Contact, Sydney, Australia
 2005  Hayward Gallery, BALTIC, The British Art Show, touring show, UK
 Arts Depot, 1001100111001, London, UK
 Talwar Gallery, (desi)re, New York, NY, US
 2003  Tate Britain, A Century of Artists' Film in Britain, London, UK

Film works 
2019: Meta Incognita: Missive II

2016: On a wing and a prayer (text by David Herd)

2010–2013: Panopticon Letters: Missive I

2008–2011: Priya

2006–2011: A Story Told

2010: Wallpaper

2005: LA Diary

2003: Eating Grass

2001: Spoken Diary

1994: The Watershed

1991: Fatima's Letter

1989: Three Paces, Swan

1987: Unfolding

1985: Durga

Selected honors, lectures and screenings 
2010- Tate Britain, Conversation Pieces, London, UK

2005- Los Angeles County Museum of Arts (LACMA), Eating Grass, Los Angeles, CA

2000- Tate Modern, Watershed in Performing Bodies, London, UK

1997- Institute of Contemporary Arts (ICA), Fatima's Letter, London, UK

1996- Institute of Contemporary Arts (ICA), Watershed in Pandemonium, London, UK

1994- Ikon Gallery, Fatima's Letter in Beyond Destination, Birmingham, UK

1991- Tate Gallery, Fatima's Letter in 25 years of British Avant Garde, London, UK

References

External links 
 The National, Eating Grass, Los Angeles, CA
 "Glasgow artist Alia Syed shortlisted for £10,000 filmmaking prize," July 2015
 Art Asia Pacific, "Eating Grass," July 2013
 New York Observer, Alia Syed: Panopticon Letters, April 1, 2013.
 LACMA, Eating Grass: Q & A with Filmmaker Alia Syed, September 2012.
 The New York Times, Alia Syed, February 6, 2004.

1964 births
Living people
20th-century Welsh women artists
21st-century Welsh women artists
British filmmakers
Artists from Swansea
Welsh people of Indian descent
Alumni of the Slade School of Fine Art
Alumni of the University of East London